Rafa is a masculine given name. 

Rafa or RAFA may also refer to:

Rafa
 Rafa, Kuyavian-Pomeranian Voivodeship, a village in central northeast Poland
 Battle of Rafa, a First World War victory by the British Empire over the Ottoman Empire

RAFA
 Royal Air Forces Association
 Ramanathan Academy of Fine Arts, a division of the University of Jaffna, Sri Lanka

See also
 Rafah, a town in Gaza Strip
 Raffa (disambiguation)